Joeri Hapers (born 23 October 1990 in Geel) is a Belgian professional squash player. As of May 2021, he was ranked number 130 in the world. He became Belgian champion in 2017 and 2022 and won his first PSA Challenger title in March 2021.

References

1990 births
Living people
Belgian male squash players
People from Geel
Sportspeople from Antwerp Province
21st-century Belgian people